The 1916 Copa de Honor Cousenier was the final match to decide the winner of the Copa de Honor Cousenier, the 11th. edition of the international competition organised by the Argentine and Uruguayan Associations together. The final was contested by Uruguayan Club Nacional de Football and Argentine Rosario Central.

The match was held in the Estadio Gran Parque Central in Montevideo, on December 10, 1916. Nacional beat Rosario Central with a conclusive 6–1, winning its third Copa Cousenier trophy

Qualified teams 

Note

Match details 

|

|}

References

Rosario Central matches
Club Nacional de Football matches
1916 in Argentine football
1916 in Uruguayan football